Saban Capital Group LLC is an American investment firm based in Los Angeles, California focused on media, entertainment, and communications investments. Formed in 2010 by Haim Saban, Saban Capital Group owns Saban Films, part of Univision Communications, and part of Celestial Tiger Entertainment.

History 
In October 2006, SCG's Saban Entertainment Group division announced the beginning of its virtual studio program for starting up and developing family entertainment. In March 2007, Univision Communications was sold to Broadcasting Media Partners which includes Saban Capital Group, Madison Dearborn Partners, Providence Equity Partners, TPG Capital, and Thomas H. Lee Partners. On October 17, 2011, Saban Capital Group acquired 7.5% stake in Jakarta-based Indonesian largest integrated media company, Media Nusantara Citra. In July 2012, Saban Capital Group acquired minority stake in PT MNC Sky Vision Tbk, the largest pay-TV operator in Indonesia which owns Indovision and Top TV. In June 2012, Kidsco Media Ventures LLC, a SCG affiliate, jointly with Konami's 4K Acquisition Corp. purchased some of the key assets of 4Kids Entertainment with Kidsco getting the Dragon Ball Z Kai, Cubix, Sonic X and The CW Network's Saturday Morning programming block contract rights. In August 2012, Saban Capital Group launched a new music publishing division called "Music Ventures".

On September 13, 2018, Saban Capital Acquisition Corp. announced the purchase of Panavision and Sim Video International in a $622 million cash and stock deal. The transaction was aimed at creating a comprehensive production and post-production entity. Saban Capital Acquisition Corp. proposed a change of name to Panavision Holdings Inc., but expected to continue to trade on the Nasdaq stock exchange. Saban ended up terminating its deal to acquire Panavision on March 1, 2019.

Saban Brands 

On May 5, 2010, Saban Capital Group announced that it would start Saban Brands (SB), a successor company to Saban Entertainment dedicated to acquiring entertainment and consumer brands. On May 12, 2010, it was announced that Saban Brands bought back the Power Rangers franchise (including some related shows) from Disney for $43 million and would produce a new nineteenth season of Power Rangers that began airing on Nickelodeon on February 7, 2011, with the previous 700 episodes being rerun on Nicktoons. It was also announced that Saban Brands is in negotiations to buy three other brands. On August 17, 2010, it was announced that Saban Brands bought Paul Frank Industries.

On May 1, 2012, Kidsco Media Ventures LLC, an affiliate of Saban Capital Group, placed a bid to acquire some of 4Kids Entertainment's assets, including the US rights to the Yu-Gi-Oh! franchise and The CW4Kids block, for $10 million. 4K Acquisition Corp, a subsidiary of Konami, then placed a bid. On June 5, 2012, 4Kids commenced an auction between Kidsco and 4K Acquisition which was then adjourned so 4Kids, Kidsco, and 4K Acquisition could consider an alternative transaction. On June 15, 2012, 4Kids filed a notice outlining a proposed deal in which its assets would be divided between Kidsco and 4K Acquisition which was finalized on June 26, 2012. The deal saw 4K Acquisition acquire the US rights to the Yu-Gi-Oh! franchise and Kidsco acquire 4Kids' other assets including the agreements for Dragon Ball Z Kai, Cubix: Robots for Everyone, Sonic X and The CW Network's Saturday morning programming block. On July 2, 2012, it was announced that Saban Brands, via Kidsco Media Ventures, would begin programming the block in the fall, and on July 12, 2012, it announced that the block would be named Vortexx, which launched on August 25, 2012, and ended on September 27, 2014.

On June 12, 2012, it was announced that Saban Brands plans to reintroduce the Popples franchise with new merchandise in fall 2013. On August 3, 2012, it was announced that Saban Brands acquired The Playforge, the development team behind App Store success stories Zombie Farm and Zombie Life. On September 19, 2012, Saban Brands announced that they acquired Zui provider of Kid-Safe Online content. On September 25, 2012, Saban Brands announced that they re-acquired the Digimon franchise and its most recent season, Digimon Fusion with Toei Animation handling Asian licensing & distribution and MarVista Entertainment handling all other global licensing & distribution.

On July 3, 2013, it was announced that Saban Brands signed a deal to manage the distribution, licensing, and merchandising of Sendokai Champions in North America and Israel and be broadcast on the Vortexx. In October 2013, Saban Brands shut down The Playforge because of poor game sales.

Saban Brands and Lionsgate Films announced in May 2014 that they are planning to produce a new Power Rangers feature film, and would hopefully launch a Power Rangers film franchise. By August 4, 2014, Saban Brands sold KidZui to Leapfrog Enterprises. Later on, Macbeth Footwear was acquired by Saban Brands, and in December, Saban Brands formed two divisions Saban Brands Lifestyle Group and Saban Brands Entertainment Group to expand their holdings. On January 6, 2014, it was announced that Saban Brands Lifestyle Group acquired Mambo Graphics. On March 24, 2015, it was announced that Saban Brands Lifestyle Group had acquired Piping Hot. Saban Brands developed its first two properties, Kibaoh Klashers and Treehouse Detectives, as animated series which were picked up by Netflix in October 2016.

In February 2018, Saban Brands appointed Hasbro as the global master toy licensee for Power Rangers in April 2019 with a future option to purchase the franchise. On May 1, 2018, Saban agreed to sell Power Rangers and other entertainment assets to Hasbro for US$522 million in cash and stock, with the sale expected to close in the second quarter. Other properties in the deal included My Pet Monster, Popples, Julius Jr., Luna Petunia, Treehouse Detectives and Saban Brands' content/media libraries. (excluding Rainbow Butterfly Unicorn Kitty, Sonic X and other properties that were sold to different companies before the deal). Saban's Digimon and Pretty Cure licenses were also transferred to Hasbro, although were later left to expire, thus reverting to Toei Animation Inc. for its international distribution. Only nine existing employees out of sixty would be retained by SCG, and the Saban Brands subsidiary ended operations upon the closure of business on December 1, 2018.

Saban Films 

On May 6, 2014, Saban Capital announced the launch of Saban Films (SF), a distribution company that will acquire yearly 8 to 10 feature films for the North American market.

Films

Units 
 Saban Entertainment Group
 Saban Kids & Family
 Saban Films
 Saban Real Estate, LLC

Investments

Current 
 Celestial Tiger Entertainment (CTE) (JV)
 Qoo10
 Taomee (minority stake)
 Playbuzz (2016)
 Bustle
 IronSource
 Sim Video International

Past 
 Bezeq
 Keshet Broadcasting LTD
 Panavision
 ProSiebenSat.1 Media AG
 Vessel
 Broadcasting Media Partners (20%)
 Univision Communications, Inc.
 Media Nusantara Citra (MNC) 7.5% stake

Political activities 
The Saban Group is a top contributor to the Democratic Party. It has donated to former President Barack Obama's campaign and was one of the top donors of the Clinton Campaign of 2016 with a contribution of approximately 12 million dollars.

Controversies 
On August 12, 2021, a lawsuit was filed against Haim Saban, Saban Capital Group, and Saban Real Estate by a Penn State University student and his mother. According to the 89-page Complaint, which was filed in U.S. District Court - Chicago, Haim Saban was the owner of off-campus student apartments, "The Bryn", located in State College, Pennsylvania, that targeted low-income college students to lure them into leasing apartments that are uninhabitable, with no working appliances. Per the Complaint, "the students are not allowed to view the apartments before paying the Defendants and signing leases, they're required to pay several months rent in advance, and the management Cardinal Group Management, makes false representations and omissions about the true conditions of the apartments, and sends the victims to collections if they refuse to pay or try to end their leases due to the fraud. The apartments are infested with black mold. The true conditions of the apartment, and the fraud is discovered at the time of move-in." The Complaint states that Haim Saban was fully aware of the fraud scheme during the time it was going on and not only failed to stop it, but instead tried to extort more money from the victims via a local State College attorney. Rossetti vs. Haim Saban et al, (2021)

List of television shows, films and libraries

Saban Entertainment Group 
 Hollywood Star Dogs
 Cirque du Soleil Media
 CNCO
 Emojiville 
 La Banda 
 Macbeth Footwear
 Mambo Graphics
 MIX5
 Paul Frank
 Piping Hot

Saban Brands

Former library content 
These properties were formerly owned by Saban Brands until 2018:

 Digimon (currently by Discotek Media and Toei Animation Inc.) 
 Rainbow Butterfly Unicorn Kitty (currently by Funrise and Jetpack Distribution)
 Shinzo (currently by Toei Animation Inc.) 
 Sonic X (currently by Discotek Media and TMS Entertainment) 

These properties are now owned by Entertainment One, via Hasbro:
 Beetleborgs 
 Cubix
 Glitter Force (co-ownership with Toei Animation Inc.)
 Julius Jr.
 Kibaoh Klashers
 Luna Petunia 
 Masked Rider
 My Pet Monster (purchased from American Greetings/TCFC, Inc.)
 Mystic Knights of Tir Na Nog
 Ninja Turtles: The Next Mutation (co-ownership with Paramount Global)
 Popples (purchased from American Greetings/TCFC, Inc.)
 Power Rangers (co-ownership with Toei Company)
 Treehouse Detectives
 VR Troopers

References

External links 
 
 Saban Brands

2010 establishments in California
American independent record labels
Anime companies
Branding companies of the United States
Companies based in Los Angeles
Financial services companies established in 2010
Investment companies of the United States
Privately held companies based in California